The duit (plural: duiten) is an old Dutch copper coin. It was manufactured in the territory of the Dutch Republic and became later an international currency. Its value was 1/8 stuiver.

Etymology 
Etymologically, the word duit comes from Middle Dutch and means a type of small coin.

History 

The Dutch East India Company (VOC) commissioned a special coin with a monogram engraved on it in order to prevent smuggling. The coin was first minted during the 17th century in the Dutch Republic and was issued in the Netherlands until the year 1816 when it was replaced by cents and ½ cents. Later it became an internationalized currency and was also issued in the Dutch East Indies, Dutch Ceylon and Dutch Malabar. Only these types of coins were valid for use in colonial-era Indonesia. The biggest destination for duit coins was Java. Duit was also used in parts of the Americas while under Dutch rule, such as New Amsterdam (present-day New York City) and Suriname; and in Africa in the Dutch Cape Colony.

The coin's name was preserved in the Netherlands for a long time as vierduitstuk (or 'plak'), because it was worth 4 duiten = half a stuiver (or 2½ cents).

Value 
According to its usage in the Netherlands, 8 duiten are equivalent to a stuiver and 160 duiten are equivalent to a guilder. When this value was applied in the Dutch East Indies colony in 1726, it was equivalent to a quarter of a stuiver (i.e. 4 duit = 1 stuiver).

Originally duit coins were minted in copper, but proof coinage of the duit was also minted in silver and gold.

Dutch expressions 
The Dutch language has many expressions, proverbs and sayings which feature the word duit''', including:
 "Putting a duit in the bag" – to contribute something
 "He is a duit-thief" – he is very greedy
 "He is snobby, but has little duit" – he is a boaster
 "To be courageous like a three-duit haddock" – to be cowardly
 "To give someone of four duit back" – to tell someone the truth

Legacy
The single largest recipient of Dutch duit coins was Java. Ceylon and Malabar did also circulate the coins. As the monetary unit was widespread throughout the Malay archipelago, the word duit eventually was absorbed into Malay vocabulary becoming a slang word for 'money' besides wang (Malaysian spelling) and uang (Indonesian spelling).

The duit is also referred to as the "New York penny" due to its use as a Colonial monetary unit in Dutch New Amsterdam (later New York) and for years later, long after Dutch rule had passed.

The Duit circulated also in the duchy of Cleves and Guelders, which may be the reason why in the 18th century the expression kein Deut entered the German language, meaning not a bit.

Duit (Duttu'') is a slang for low denomination money in Tamil.

Bibliography

References

External links
 

Copper coins
Coins of the Netherlands
Dutch Republic
Dutch East India Company
Dutch Cape Colony
Dutch Ceylon
Dutch East Indies
Indonesian words and phrases
Malay words and phrases
Coins of Sri Lanka